Lee Sun is a female former international table tennis player from South Korea.

Table tennis career
She won a bronze medal for South Korea at the 1985 World Table Tennis Championships in the Corbillon Cup (women's team event) with Lee Soo-ja, Yoon Kyung-mi and Yang Young-Ja.

See also
 List of World Table Tennis Championships medalists

References

Living people
Year of birth missing (living people)
South Korean female table tennis players
Asian Games medalists in table tennis
Table tennis players at the 1986 Asian Games
Medalists at the 1986 Asian Games
Asian Games gold medalists for South Korea
World Table Tennis Championships medalists
20th-century South Korean women